Rachel Leah Bloom (born April 3, 1987) is an American actress, comedian, writer, singer, and producer. She is best known for co-creating and starring as Rebecca Bunch in The CW musical comedy-drama series Crazy Ex-Girlfriend (2015–2019), for which she received numerous accolades, including a Golden Globe Award, a TCA Award, a Critics' Choice Television Award, and a Primetime Emmy Award.

Bloom first became known for her YouTube comedy music videos, including the Hugo Award-nominated video "Fuck Me, Ray Bradbury". She has also appeared in films, including Most Likely to Murder (2018), The Angry Birds Movie 2 (2019), Trolls World Tour (2020), Bar Fight! (2022), and The School for Good and Evil (2022).

Early life
Bloom was born on April 3, 1987, in Los Angeles County, California, and grew up in Manhattan Beach. She is the only child of Shelli (née Rosenberg), a musician, and Alan Bloom, a healthcare lawyer. She is Jewish.

Bloom attended Manhattan Beach public schools including Mira Costa High School, where she was involved in the school's drama program. According to Bloom, she used performance as a way to try to fit in. In 2009, Bloom graduated from the New York University's Tisch School of the Arts with a BFA in Drama. While at NYU, Bloom was the head writer and director of the school's premier sketch comedy group, Hammerkatz. Post-college, Bloom performed at Upright Citizens Brigade Theatre in New York and Los Angeles. She was once roommates with comedian Ilana Glazer after college in Brooklyn.

Career
In April 2010, Bloom wrote and sang the song "Fuck Me, Ray Bradbury", which gained a cult following when it was released on Ray Bradbury's 90th birthday in 2010. The song was inspired by her favorite Ray Bradbury book, The Martian Chronicles. There was a photo of Bradbury posted online that purported to show him watching the video. She worked as an intern for head writer Seth Meyers at Saturday Night Live. In 2012, she unsuccessfully auditioned for the show, submitting an audition video that included a bit as Katharine Hepburn doing the voice for Bugs Bunny in Space Jam.

On May 13, 2013, Bloom released her first album of musical comedy, Please Love Me, which included the viral songs "Fuck Me, Ray Bradbury" and "You Can Touch My Boobies". On November 19, 2013, she released her second album Suck It, Christmas, which featured a comedic look at Chanukah and included the song "Chanukah Honey". On December 17, 2013, Bloom was the voice of Princess Peach in the song "Luigi's Ballad" on Starbomb's self-titled debut album. Bloom co-wrote "Super Friend" performed by Melissa Benoist and Grant Gustin, featured on the musical crossover episode of Supergirl and The Flash titled "Duet" and the soundtrack released from the episode.

On April 25, 2016, Bloom was awarded the "Visionary Award" at the annual gala held by East West Players, the longest-running professional theatre of color in the United States. The award seeks to honor "individuals who have raised the visibility of the Asian Pacific American (APA) community through their craft”; her show Crazy Ex-Girlfriend was lauded for its decision to cast an Asian-American male in a trope and stereotype-subverting lead role.

Bloom has worked as a television writer on Allen Gregory and Robot Chicken.

In April 2017, Bloom appeared on "The Sexual Spectrum" episode of Bill Nye Saves the World, performing the song "My Sex Junk" concerning the gender and sexual spectra. The performance and episode were controversial, garnering a mixed response with backlash from conservative groups and on social media, where Bloom was threatened. The episode received an Emmy nomination.

Bloom co-starred in the film Most Likely to Murder, opposite Adam Pally and Vincent Kartheiser. The film was directed by Dan Gregor, Bloom's husband. It premiered at the SXSW Film Festival in March 2018, and was released on Digital and on Demand in May 2018.

On October 10, 2019, she was featured in a 30-minute YouTube documentary called Laughing Matters, created by SoulPancake in collaboration with Funny or Die, wherein a variety of comedians discuss mental health. She also appeared in the show My Little Pony, on the episode "Sounds of Silence", playing a kirin named Autumn Blaze.

On November 18, 2020, Bloom was awarded the Lifesaver Award from ELEM/Youth in Distress in Israel, a nonprofit aiding youth in distress in Israel, at its Hats off to Heroes virtual gala.

Crazy Ex-Girlfriend 

On May 7, 2015, Bloom filmed a half-hour pilot for Showtime with co-executive producer Aline Brosh McKenna (The Devil Wears Prada), directed by Marc Webb. It was eventually picked up by The CW for the fall 2015–2016 season. Crazy-Ex Girlfriend became a critically acclaimed hour-long series with more network-friendly content when it transitioned from cable to network TV and features musical numbers. The show premiered on October 12, 2015.

On January 10, 2016, Bloom won the Golden Globe Award for Best Actress in a Television Series, Musical or Comedy. The following week, Bloom won the Critics' Choice Television Award for Best Actress in a Comedy Series. On September 23, 2019, Bloom won the 71st Primetime Emmy Award for Outstanding Original Music and Lyrics for her work on Crazy Ex-Girlfriend.

"Holy Shit (You've Got to Vote)"

"Holy Shit (You've Got to Vote)" is a 2016 video created by Rachel Bloom to encourage people to vote in the 2016 election. The star-filled cast sang profanity laced lyrics directed at Donald Trump such as "Donald Trump is human syphilis/we could be the antidote". The video caught the attention of many news outlets, though some questioned its effectiveness retrospectively.

Personal life
In 2015, Bloom married her boyfriend of six years, writer, actor, producer and director Dan Gregor. Her cousin, a rabbi, performed the ceremony. They have a daughter, born in 2020.

Bloom has a history of mental illness, having been diagnosed with depression, anxiety, and OCD, about which she has candidly spoken. Bloom's character in Crazy Ex-Girlfriend has borderline personality disorder, and the show addresses these issues.

Filmography

Film

Television

Bibliography

Books
In November 2020, it was announced that Bloom would be releasing a memoir, titled I Want To Be Where The Normal People Are, published by Grand Central Publishing. The book was released on November 17, 2020. It explores Bloom's own mental health struggles and experiences with bullying, both as a child and as an adult in the entertainment industry, along with her experiences in the 2020 COVID-19 pandemic in the United States.

Discography

Studio albums

Soundtrack albums

Singles

Other appearances

Music videos

Awards and nominations

References

External links

 
 

1987 births
21st-century American actresses
21st-century American comedians
21st-century American women singers
21st-century American women writers
21st-century American writers
Actresses from Los Angeles
American comedy musicians
American television actresses
American television writers
American voice actresses
American women screenwriters
American women television writers
Best Musical or Comedy Actress Golden Globe (television) winners
Jewish American actresses
Jewish American songwriters
Jewish American female comedians
Jewish women singers
Living people
People from Manhattan Beach, California
People with obsessive–compulsive disorder
Primetime Emmy Award winners
Screenwriters from California
Songwriters from California
Television producers from California
Tisch School of the Arts alumni
Upright Citizens Brigade Theater performers
American women television producers
Writers from Los Angeles
Mira Costa High School alumni
Singers from Los Angeles
American sketch comedians
Comedians from Los Angeles County